The Embassy of Iran in Stockholm is Iran's diplomatic mission to Sweden. It is located at Elfviksvägen 76, Västra Yttringe gård, on Lidingö. Until 1971, the embassy was located in the Villa Gumælius mansion in Diplomatstaden, Stockholm. The current ambassador of Iran to Sweden is Ahmad Masoumifar

Formal diplomatic relations between Sweden and Iran were established in 1929, when a treaty of friendship was signed between the two countries.

Protests at the embassy
On 24 August 1981, a group of thirty-three Iranian exile students stormed into and occupied the embassy in protest of extrajudicial executions and violence in Iran. Earlier during the summer, under the rule of Mohammad-Ali Rajai, about 700 extrajudicial executions had been carried out in Iran. Later the same day, Swedish police forces stormed the building to release the then ambassador of Iran to Sweden, Abdel Rahmin Gahavi, his wife and a servant who had been taken hostage. The protestors were arrested and taken to the Kronoberg Remand Prison in Stockholm, where twenty-nine of them were later detained in custody pending trial.

On 26 June 2009, in wake of the 2009 Iranian election protests, about 150 people gathered outside the embassy to protest against the Iranian regime. Some of the protesters managed to enter the embassy building, where they engaged in fighting with the embassy's personnel. According to the police, one member of the embassy staff was injured in the clashes. In addition, a few of the protesters were injured and one policeman. The police later managed to evict the demonstrators from the building and arrested one person.

See also 
 Iran–Sweden relations
 Iranian diplomatic missions
 Foreign relations of Iran

References

External links
 Embassy of the Islamic Republic of Iran, official website

Lidingö Municipality
Iran
Stockholm
Iran–Sweden relations